Physalis peruviana is a species of plant in the nightshade family (Solanaceae) native to Colombia, Ecuador and Peru. Within that region it is called aguaymanto, uvilla or uchuva, in addition to numerous indigenous and regional names. In English, its common names include Cape gooseberry, goldenberry and Peruvian groundcherry.

The history of P. peruviana cultivation in South America can be traced to the Inca Empire. It has been cultivated in England since the late 18th century, and in South Africa in the Cape of Good Hope since at least the start of the 19th century. Widely introduced in the 20th century, P. peruviana is now cultivated or grows wild across the world in temperate and tropical regions.

Taxonomy and common names
Physalis peruviana was given a botanical species description by Carl Linnaeus in 1763. 
The term uvilla is one of the names for P. peruviana in Ecuador.

It was grown in England in 1774 and by early settlers of the Cape of Good Hope before 1807. Whether it was grown there before its introduction to England is not known, but sources since the mid-19th century attribute the common English name "Cape gooseberry" to this fact. An alternative suggestion is that name refers to the calyx surrounding the fruit like a cape, possibly an example of false etymology, because it does not appear in publications earlier than the mid-20th century. Not long after its introduction to South Africa, P. peruviana was introduced to Australia, New Zealand and various Pacific islands. Despite its common name, it is not botanically related to the true gooseberries of the genus Ribes.

It is called poha in Hawaii and Harankash in Egypt.

Description
P. peruviana is closely related to the tomatillo. As a member of the plant family Solanaceae, it is also more distantly related to a large number of edible plants, including tomatoes, eggplants, and potatoes.

P. peruviana is an annual in temperate locations, but a perennial in the tropics. As a perennial, it develops into a diffusely branched shrub reaching  in height, with spreading branches and velvety, heart-shaped leaves. After the flower falls, the calyx expands, ultimately forming a beige husk fully enclosing the fruit.

Removed from its calyx, it is bright yellow to orange in color, and sweet when ripe, with a characteristic, mildly tart grape-like flavor.

A prominent feature is the inflated, papery calyx enclosing each berry. The calyx is accrescent until the fruit is fully grown; at first, it is of normal size, but after the petals fall, it continues to grow until it forms a protective cover around the growing fruit. If the fruit is left inside the intact calyx husks, its shelf life at room temperature is about 30–45 days. The calyx is inedible.

Nutrition
Raw cape gooseberries are 85% water, 11% carbohydrates, 2% protein, and 1% fat (table).

Analyses of oil from different berry components, primarily its seeds, showed that linoleic acid and oleic acid were the main fatty acids, beta-sitosterol and campesterol were principal phytosterols, and the oil contained vitamin K and beta-carotene.

Distribution and habitat
The center of genetic diversity for Physalis peruviana is in the Andes mountains of Chile, Colombia, and Peru. It grows in forests, forest edges, and riparian areas. The plant has become invasive in some natural habitats, forming thickets, particularly in Hawaii and on other Pacific islands. There are believed to be dozens of ecotypes worldwide that differentiated by plant size, calyx shape, and the size, color, and flavor of the fruit. Wild forms are thought to be diploid with 2n = 24 chromosomes, while cultivated forms include varieties with increased ploidy and 32 or 48 chromosomes.

Cultivation
It has been widely introduced into cultivation in tropical, subtropical, and temperate areas such as Australia, China, India, Malaysia, and the Philippines. It grows well in Mediterranean climates and is hardy to USDA hardiness zone 8, meaning it can be damaged by frost. It grows well in rainfall amounts of  if the soil is well drained, and prefers full sun or partial shade in well-drained soil, and grows vigorously in sandy loam.

The plant is readily grown from seeds, which are abundant (100 to 300 in each fruit), but with low germination rates, requiring thousands of seeds to sow a hectare. Plants grown from year-old stem cuttings will flower early and yield well, but are less vigorous than those grown from seed.

Pests and diseases
In South Africa, cutworms attack the Cape gooseberry in seedbeds, red spiders in the field, and potato tuber moths near potato fields. Hares damage young plants, and birds eat the fruits. Mites, whiteflies and flea beetles can also be problematic. Powdery mildew, soft brown scale, root rot and viruses may affect plants. In New Zealand, plants can be infected by Candidatus Liberibacter solanacearum.

Culinary uses
P. peruviana is an economically useful crop as an exotic exported fruit, and is favored in breeding and cultivation programs of many countries. P. peruviana fruits are marketed in the United States as goldenberry and sometimes Pichuberry, named after Machu Picchu in order to associate the fruit with its cultivation in Peru.

Cape gooseberries are made into fruit-based sauces, pies, puddings, chutneys, jams and ice cream, or eaten fresh in salads and fruit salads. In Latin America, it is often consumed as a batido or smoothie, and because of its showy husk, it is used in restaurants as a decorative garnish for desserts. To enhance its food uses, hot air drying improves qualities of dietary fiber content, texture and appearance.

In basic research on fruit maturation, the content of polyphenols and vitamin C varied by cultivar, harvest time, and ripening stage.

Potential for toxicity
Unripe raw fruits, flowers, leaves, and stems of the plant contain solanine and solanidine alkaloids that may cause poisoning if ingested by humans, cattle or horses.

See also
Physalis pubescens (a closely related species with sprouts that are noticeably less hairy)

References

peruviana
Edible Solanaceae
Berries
Fruit vegetables
Crops originating from South America
Taxa named by Carl Linnaeus
Plants described in 1763